Streptomyces formicae is a species of bacteria from the genus Streptomyces, which has been isolated from the ant Camponotus japonicus in Harbin in China and the ant Tetraponera  penzigi in Africa.   The complete genome sequence of S. formicae was published in 2017.

See also 
 List of Streptomyces species

References

External links
Type strain of Streptomyces formicae at BacDive -  the Bacterial Diversity Metadatabase

 

formicae
Bacteria described in 2016